The 2005 World Table Tennis Championships women's singles was the 48th edition of the women's singles championship.
Zhang Yining defeated Guo Yan in the final by four sets to two, to the title.

Seeds

  Zhang Yining (champion)
  Wang Nan (third round)
  Niu Jianfeng (quarterfinals)
  Tamara Boroš (fourth round)
  Guo Yue (semifinals)
  Li Jiawei (third round)
  Tie Ya Na (fourth round)
  Guo Yan (final)
  Liu Jia (third round)
  Kim Kyung-ah (third round)
  Lau Sui Fei (third round)
  Cao Zhen (fourth round)
  Mihaela Steff (third round)
  Viktoria Pavlovich (quarterfinals)
  Zhang Rui (third round)
  Lin Ling (semifinals)
  Gao Jun (quarterfinals)
  Song Ah Sim (fourth round)
  Li Jiao (quarterfinals)
  Krisztina Tóth (fourth round)
  Ai Fukuhara (third round)
  Kim Hyang-mi (fourth round)
  Fan Ying (fourth round)
  Aya Umemura (second round)
  Nicole Struse (second round)
  Otilia Bădescu (second round)
  Wenling Tan Monfardini (third round)
  Georgina Póta (third round)
  Elke Wosik (third round)
  Zhang Xueling (third round)
  Svetlana Ganina (third round)
  Mária Fazekas (first round)

Finals

Main draw

Top half

Section 1

Section 2

Section 3

Section 4

Bottom half

Section 5

Section 6

Section 7

Section 8

References

External links
 Players' matches. ITTF.
 WM 2005 Shanghai (China). tt-wiki.info (in German).

2005 World Table Tennis Championships
World